Begonia aequilateralis Irmsch., 1929 is a species of begonia known only from the Sungai Buloh area of Selangor, Peninsular Malaysia.

"...probably the most endangered begonia in the Peninsula, being known from a single small population in a forest area currently being cleared." - Kiew, p. 261

References

 , Mitteilungen aus dem Institut für allgemeine Botanik in Hamburg   8:134.  1929
 , Begonias of Peninsular Malaysia :261-264, 2005
 
 tfbc.frim.gov: "Saving a highly endangered begonia" 

aequilateralis
Endemic flora of Selangor
Flora of Peninsular Malaysia
Endangered plants
Plants described in 1929